The 1998 Mecklenburg-Vorpommern state election was held on 27 September 1998 to elect the members of the 3rd Landtag of Mecklenburg-Vorpommern. The incumbent government was a grand coalition of the Christian Democratic Union (CDU) and Social Democratic Party (SPD) led by Minister-President Berndt Seite. The SPD overtook the CDU as the largest party and chose not to continue the grand coalition. They subsequently formed a coalition with the Party of Democratic Socialism (PDS), and SPD leader Harald Ringstorff was elected Minister-President.

Parties
The table below lists parties represented in the 2nd Landtag of Mecklenburg-Vorpommern.

Opinion polling

Election result

|-
! colspan="2" | Party
! Votes
! %
! +/-
! Seats 
! +/-
! Seats %
|-
| bgcolor=| 
| align=left | Social Democratic Party (SPD)
| align=right| 371,885
| align=right| 34.3
| align=right| 4.8
| align=right| 27
| align=right| 4
| align=right| 38.0
|-
| bgcolor=| 
| align=left | Christian Democratic Union (CDU)
| align=right| 327,948
| align=right| 30.2
| align=right| 7.5
| align=right| 24
| align=right| 6
| align=right| 33.8
|-
| bgcolor=| 
| align=left | Party of Democratic Socialism (PDS)
| align=right| 264,299
| align=right| 24.4
| align=right| 1.7
| align=right| 20
| align=right| 2
| align=right| 28.2
|-
! colspan=8|
|-
| bgcolor=| 
| align=left | German People's Union (DVU)
| align=right| 31,194
| align=right| 2.9
| align=right| 2.9
| align=right| 0
| align=right| ±0
| align=right| 0
|-
| bgcolor=| 
| align=left | Alliance 90/The Greens (Grüne)
| align=right| 29,240
| align=right| 2.7
| align=right| 1.0
| align=right| 0
| align=right| ±0
| align=right| 0
|-
| bgcolor=| 
| align=left | Free Democratic Party (FDP)
| align=right| 17,062
| align=right| 1.6
| align=right| 2.2
| align=right| 0
| align=right| ±0
| align=right| 0
|-
| 
| align=left | Pro DM
| align=right| 15,619
| align=right| 1.4
| align=right| New
| align=right| 0
| align=right| New
| align=right| 0
|-
| bgcolor=| 
| align=left | National Democratic Party of Germany (NPD)
| align=right| 11,531
| align=right| 1.1
| align=right| 1.0
| align=right| 0
| align=right| ±0
| align=right| 0
|-
| bgcolor=|
| align=left | Others
| align=right| 5,809
| align=right| 1.5
| align=right| 
| align=right| 0
| align=right| ±0
| align=right| 0
|-
! align=right colspan=2| Total
! align=right| 1,084,511
! align=right| 100.0
! align=right| 
! align=right| 71
! align=right| 5
! align=right| 
|-
! align=right colspan=2| Voter turnout
! align=right| 
! align=right| 79.4
! align=right| 6.5
! align=right| 
! align=right| 
! align=right| 
|}

Sources
 Wahl zum Landtag von Mecklenburg-Vorpommern

1998 elections in Germany
1998
1990s in Mecklenburg-Western Pomerania